Why Cry at Parting? is a 1929 British-German silent film directed by Richard Eichberg and starring Dina Gralla, Harry Halm and Paul Morgan.

The film's sets were designed by the art directors Willi Herrmann, Herbert O. Phillips and Werner Schlichting. It was shot at the Babelsberg Studios in Berlin and on location in Southampton.

Cast
 Dina Gralla as Sybil Werner
 Harry Halm as Frank Western, Prokurist von Harder & Co.
 Paul Morgan as Harder, Chef des Bankhauses Harder & Co.
 Antonie Jaeckel as Mrs. Harder, seine Frau
 Lottina Baart as Agathe, seine Tochter
 S.Z. Sakall as Gottgetreu, Kassierer von Harder & Co.
 Paul Hörbiger as Tortoni, ein Illusionist
 Vera Voronina as Pamela, seine Partnerin
 Gerhard Pechner sings: "Casanova"
 Maria Forescu
 Else Reval
 Adi Seitz as Adelheid
 Sylvia Torf
 Felix Verna as Black Dancer
 Michael von Newlinsky

References

Bibliography 
 Hans-Michael Bock and Tim Bergfelder. The Concise Cinegraph: An Encyclopedia of German Cinema. Berghahn Books, 2009.

External links 
 

1929 films
British silent feature films
Films of the Weimar Republic
1920s German-language films
German silent feature films
Films directed by Richard Eichberg
UFA GmbH films
German black-and-white films
Transitional sound films
British black-and-white films
Films shot at Babelsberg Studios
1920s German films